Carex longebrachiata, commonly known as Australian sedge or drooping sedge, is a plant species in the sedge family, Cyperaceae. It is native to Australia.

Description
The species culmes are erect, smooth on the bottom and scabrous above. The species have 1-8 spikes which are long-pedicellate and droop by maturity. The upper spike is gynaecandrous but under rare circumstances can be androgynaecandrous. Glumes are yellowish-brown to red-brown are acute, obtuse and mucronate. Its apex is split with the anthers being circa  in length (excluding  appendages).

References

longebrachiata
Plants described in 1877
Poales of Australia